Dichomeris badiolineariella is a moth in the family Gelechiidae. It was described by Ponomarenko and Ueda in 2004. It is found in Thailand.

The forewings are greyish brown, with light grey lines along the veins and dark brown streaks running parallel to the veins. The pattern of the forewings consists of eight dark brown oblique costal marks of different width and length, the first and eight of them largest. The large dark brown spot at the end of the cell and a smaller one at one-third of the anal fold. There is a distinct light grey arched line placed under the anal fold. The hindwings are brownish grey, the basal part of the costal margin with white scales.

Etymology
The species name is derived from Latin badi- (meaning castaneous) and lineari (meaning linear).

References

Moths described in 2004
badiolineariella